The 2021–22 AHL season was the 86th season of the American Hockey League. The regular season began on October 15, 2021, and ended on April 30, 2022. The regular season was followed by the Calder Cup playoffs, which had not been held since 2019 due to the onset of the COVID-19 pandemic. The playoffs began on May 2, 2022, and ended on June 25, 2022, with the Chicago Wolves winning their third Calder Cup.

League changes
Due to the then-ongoing COVID-19 pandemic during the previous season, the league had a temporary alignment consisting of five divisions. The league's Canada-based teams only played intradivisional games and could not cross the international border due to pandemic travel restrictions. The league expected to return to a normal schedule and with an updated alignment following team relocations, teams returning, and the lightening of pandemic restrictions. The new alignment was announced on June 7, 2021, returning to the previous four divisions used in 2019–20 with the exception of the Abbotsford team and the Henderson Silver Knights joining the Pacific Division, increasing it to nine teams, while the Binghamton Devils and the former San Antonio Rampage were removed from the North and Central Divisions, respectively, decreasing each to seven teams.

As part of the alignment, the league would continue to have an imbalanced schedule with each team either playing 76, 72, or 68 games during the regular season. The Macgregor Kilpatrick Trophy for the regular season champion was still awarded based on points percentage. The league planned for this to be the last season with the imbalanced scheduling with the expectation that all teams will play a 72-game schedule in 2022–23.

On October 11, 2021, the league announced it had added female officials, seven referees and three linespeople, to its officiating crew for the first time.

On January 1, 2022, the league announced it had extended the regular season by six days, from ending on April 24 to ending April 30, citing COVID-related game postponements.

Team and NHL affiliation changes
The league returned to 31 active teams with the Charlotte Checkers, Milwaukee Admirals, and Springfield Thunderbirds returning from a pandemic-related hiatus.

The Binghamton Devils' franchise was relocated to Utica, New York, as the Utica Comets. The Comets adopted a color scheme of red, black, and white, to match the colors of the Devils. 
The Bridgeport Sound Tigers were rebranded as the Bridgeport Islanders by their parent club, the New York Islanders.
The franchise that was operating as the Utica Comets, and owned by the Vancouver Canucks, was relocated to Abbotsford, British Columbia, as the Abbotsford Canucks.

Affiliation changes
Due to the three teams returning from their pandemic hiatus, the temporary secondary NHL affiliations from the previous season ended. However, the addition of a 32nd NHL team in Seattle added one dual affiliation.

Coaching changes

Final standings 
 indicates team has clinched division and a playoff spot
 indicates team has clinched a playoff spot
 indicates team has been eliminated from playoff contention

Final standings as of April 30, 2022

Eastern Conference

Western Conference

Statistical leaders

Leading skaters 
The following players are sorted by points, then goals.  Final as of April 30, 2022.

GP = Games played; G = Goals; A = Assists; Pts = Points; +/– = Plus-minus; PIM = Penalty minutes

Leading goaltenders 
The following goaltenders with a minimum 1,380 minutes played lead the league in goals against average. Final as of April 30, 2022.

GP = Games played; TOI = Time on ice (in minutes); SA = Shots against; GA = Goals against; SO = Shutouts; GAA = Goals against average; SV% = Save percentage; W = Wins; L = Losses; OT = Overtime/shootout loss

Calder Cup playoffs

Playoff format
Following two seasons of not awarding the Calder Cup due to the COVID-19 pandemic, the 2022 Calder Cup playoffs format was completely revamped from the previous version format of the 2019 playoffs by expanding from 16 teams to 23 teams that qualify for the postseason. During the regular season, teams receive two points for a win and one point for an overtime or shootout loss with teams in each division ranked by points percentage (points earned divided by points available). At the conclusion of the regular season, all but the bottom two teams in each division qualify for the playoffs: six in the Atlantic, five in the North, five in the Central, and seven in the Pacific. The first round is organized so that four teams per division remain to play in the divisional semifinals.

The 2022 playoffs continued to feature a divisional playoff format, leading to the conference finals and ultimately the Calder Cup finals. The first round was be a best-of-three series, followed by division semifinals and finals as best-of-five series, and the conference finals and Calder Cup finals were a best-of-seven. The top two teams in the Atlantic, top three teams in each of the North and Central, and the first-place team in the Pacific Division received byes into the division semifinals.

Bracket

AHL awards

All-Star Teams
First All-Star Team
Dustin Wolf (G) – Stockton
Jordan Gross (D) – Colorado
Jordan Spence (D) – Ontario
Stefan Noesen (F) – Chicago
Andrew Poturalski (F) – Chicago
T. J. Tynan (F) – Ontario

Second All-Star Team
Troy Grosenick (G) – Providence
Jake Christiansen (D) – Cleveland
Joseph Duszak (D) – Toronto
Martin Frk (F) – Ontario
Seth Griffith (F) – Bakersfield
Kiefer Sherwood (F) – Colorado

All-Rookie Team
 Dustin Wolf (G) – Stockton
Jack Rathbone (D) – Abbotsford
 Jordan Spence (D) – Ontario
Jakob Pelletier (F) – Stockton
JJ Peterka (F) – Rochester
Jack Quinn (F) – Rochester

See also
List of AHL seasons

References

External links
AHL official site

American Hockey League seasons
2021–22 in American ice hockey by league
2021–22 in Canadian ice hockey by league